Lorenzo Maria Balconi (4 August 1878 – 10 April 1969) was an Italian archbishop of the Catholic Church, missionary, and writer.

Early life 
Lorenzo Maria Balconi was born on 4 August 1878 in Milan. He entered the Pontifical Institute for Foreign Missions (PIME) in Milan at the age of 20, and two years later, on 22 December 1900, was ordained a priest by Cardinal Andrea Carlo Ferrari, the Archbishop of Milan.

In 1901, at the age of 23, he left for China, beginning a mission in Nanyang, Henan. On his return to Italy, he brought several historical artifacts, such as gold coins from Imperial China, which were housed in the PIME museum in Milan.

Episcopate 
On 18 February 1928, Pope Pius XI appointed Balconi the Vicar Apostolic of Hanzhong and the Titular Bishop of Mylasa. On 17 May, he was ordained to the episcopacy by Bishop Flaminio Belotti. In March 1934, he resigned the office of vicar apostolic, and assumed in a ceremony in Hong Kong the position of Superior General of the Pontifical Institute for Foreign Missions, being appointed by Pius XI.

On 3 August 1939, Pope Pius XII appointed him Titular Archbishop of Hierapolis in Phrygia. He returned to Italy to direct PIME, and assumed the responsibility of founding the Missionaries of the Immaculate Conception. In his later years, he followed the activities of the order, and died in Milan on 10 April 1969.

References

External links 
 

1878 births
1969 deaths
Clergy from Milan
Italian Roman Catholic missionaries
20th-century Italian Roman Catholic titular archbishops
Rectors of the Pontificio Collegio Urbano de Propaganda Fide